A-League Women (known as the Liberty A-League for sponsorship reasons), formerly the W-League, is the top-division women's soccer league in Australia. The W-League was established in 2008 by Football Australia (then known as Football Federation Australia) and was originally composed of eight teams of which seven had an affiliation with an existing A-League Men club. As of the 2021–22 season, the league is contested by ten teams. The league, as well as the A-League Men and A-League Youth are administered by the Australian Professional Leagues.

Seasons now run from November to April and include a 22-round regular season and an end-of-season finals series playoff tournament involving the highest-placed teams, culminating in a Grand Final match. The winner of the regular season tournament is dubbed 'premiers' and the winner of the grand final is dubbed 'champions'. Since the league's inaugural season, a total of five clubs have been crowned premiers and five clubs have been crowned champions. It has been currently running in a semi-professional basis, but talks about professionalisation has been emerging, beginning with the name change and placing of all women's clubs into one single Australian Professional Leagues operation and management in 2021, which served as the precursors for complete transition to professionalism of the A-League Women.

Sydney FC are the current premiers, having won their fourth title; Melbourne Victory are the current champions, having won their third title.

History

Between 1996 and 2004 the Women's National Soccer League (WNSL) was Australia's top women's soccer league. In 2004 it was discontinued alongside the men's National Soccer League.

After Australia qualified for the quarter-finals of the 2007 FIFA Women's World Cup, head coach Tom Sermanni felt the establishment of a professional league was vital for continuing the development of players. Football Federation Australia established the league the following year. The W-League was initially composed of eight teams: Adelaide United, Brisbane Roar, Central Coast Mariners, Melbourne Victory, Newcastle Jets, Perth Glory, and Sydney FC. Seven of the eight teams were affiliated with A-League clubs, and shared their names and colours to promote their brands. The eighth club was Canberra United.

The W-League's inaugural season commenced on 25 October 2008, with Perth hosting Sydney at Members Equity Stadium. After ten rounds, the regular season finished with Queensland Roar as the top-placed team, becoming the first W-League premiers, and advancing to the semi-finals along with the second-, third- and fourth-placed teams. Queensland faced Canberra in the 2009 W-League grand final, defeating them 2–0 to take the champions trophy.

Central Coast Mariners were forced to withdraw from the 2010–11 season due to a lack of funding, but are scheduled to return in 2023–24.

When Western Sydney Wanderers joined the A-League for the 2012–13 season, they also entered a team into the W-League, returning the competition to eight teams. From 2012 to 2014, the W-League champion team qualified into an international competition, the International Women's Club Championship.

On 13 May 2015, Melbourne City were confirmed to compete in the W-League from the 2015–16 season. The club had a remarkable inaugural season, winning all 12 of its regular season games and winning the Grand Final.

From the inception of the competition the league was run by Football Federation Australia, the governing body for the sport in Australia. In July 2019, the FFA relinquished operational control of the league to each of the clubs, represented by the Australian Professional Football Clubs Association.

The league commenced a further expansion program starting in 2021, with Wellington Phoenix commencing in the 2021–22 season, Western United for the 2022–23 season, and Central Coast Mariners for the 2023–24 season. This expands the league to 12 teams.

Competition format
The A-League Women regular season typically runs from November to April and consists of 20 games per team, with the highest ranked team winning the title of "Premier". The top four teams in the regular season then advance to the single-game knockout semi-finals, with the Champion determined by the victor of the Grand Final. On 12 December 2022, the Australian Professional Leagues announced that the grand finals for the 2022–23, 2023–2024 and 2024–25 seasons would be hosted in Sydney, a move which received considerable backlash.

Broadcasting rights
In the 2019–20 season, ABC TV broadcast one game per weekend. Fourteen rounds of that season were broadcast at 4pm on Sundays, as well as the whole W-League 2020 Finals Series. Fox Sport's contract with the A-League, which was renegotiated in June 2020 amidst the COVID-19 pandemic, concluded in July 2021.

Since August 2021, as part of a five-year deal with ViacomCBS, the A-Leagues have been broadcast by Network 10 and Paramount+ (Australia) streaming service. As of the 2022–23 season, Paramount and Network 10's free-to-access streaming service 10Play stream all matches.

In New Zealand, A-League Men and A-League Women matches are broadcast on Sky Sport/beIN Sports.

Clubs

Performance record
Performance and ranking of clubs based on their best regular season result in the W-League and A-League Women. The 2021–22 season is Wellington Phoenix's first season.

Organisation

Squad formation and salaries

An A-League Women squad is required to have a minimum of 20 and a maximum of 26 players. Players typically receive a one-season contract, with many playing in leagues in other countries during the A-League Women off-season.  Due to the A-League Women season running during the off-season of several leagues around the world, many foreign players have played for teams in A-League Women and vice versa.

In 2015, teams in what was then the W-League had a salary cap of A$150,000. Individual player salaries varied, with one player reporting to The Sydney Morning Herald in 2012 that whilst some players earn $10,000, others earn nothing. In 2014, it was reported that Sydney FC players were paid salaries ranging from $1,000 to $6,000. Players could also earn money playing overseas and may therefore be considered by Professional Footballers Australia (PFA) as professional.

Some clubs are owned by their state soccer associations including Adelaide United and Newcastle Jets.

For the 2017–18 season a minimum salary was introduced at A$10,000. The average salary therefore rose from A$15,500 to A$17,400. A salary cap was set at A$300,000.

The total salary floor, or minimum salary spend, for the 2020-21 season rose to A$294,000, growing to A$315,000 in the 2021-22 season, with a salary cap of A$450,000, as part of a five year deal that will see the salary floor rise to A$390,000 by 2025-26. The deal also included improved standards in training venues, travel and accommodation, high performance staffing, and player workloads. The A-League Women minimum annual wage in 2021 is A$17,055.

Stadiums

A-League Women games have been played in 33 stadiums since the inaugural season of the A-League.

Broadcasting
The 2018–19 season marked the first time that fans were able to watch every W-League game. All matches were broadcast or streamed on Fox Sports, SBS Viceland and the My Football Live app. Thursday Night Football was also introduced, meaning 13 stand-alone regular season matches will be played in prime-time and broadcast live on Fox Sports. The Football Federation Australia (FFA) reached a deal with ESPN+ for broadcast rights to W-League games in the United States. ESPN+ will carry at least 17 W-League matches in the 2018–19 season. For the first time ever W-League games would be broadcast on YouTube and Twitter in territories without a traditional broadcast partner. From July 2019 to the end of the 2020–21 season, Foxtel broadcast all matches with ABC broadcasting one match per round live on its primary channel.

From the 2021–22 season onward, A-League Women will be streamed on Paramount+ with Sunday afternoon matches broadcast on 10 Bold, after Network 10 acquired the rights to both A-League Men and Women competitions.

Referees

A-League Women features women referees and assistant referees from Australia. Current referees include:

 Kate Jacewicz, who has refereed nine of the first eleven Finals. 
 Katie Patterson

Honours

Records

Most appearances

As of 19 March 2023
Players listed in bold are still actively playing in the A-League Women.

Top scorersAs of 19 March 2023.''
Players listed in bold are still actively playing in the A-League Women.

See also

 AFC Women's Club Championship
 A-League Women records and statistics
 Women's soccer in Australia
 Australia women's national soccer team
 Women's National Soccer League (WNSL) – defunct Australian women's national league

Notes

References

External links

 
Summer association football leagues
2008 establishments in Australia
1
Professional sports leagues in Australia
Silver Lake (investment firm) companies
Sports leagues established in 2008
Australia